The Squall World Tour is a concert tour by Korean singer Rain. The tour is to travel Southeast Asia with more dates to be added. This is Rain's first full concert tour after his compulsory military service.

History
Since ending his military service, Rain has done small tours in Japan and China as well as performing at various events. After parting ways with Cube Entertainment and starting his own company, it was announced that Rain would be going on his first world tour in years. The tour begins in China with dates in Hong Kong and South Korea. Several of the tour dates were sold out, including the shows in Hong Kong.

Tour dates

References

External links
Rain's official site

2015 concert tours
2016 concert tours
Rain (entertainer) concert tours